Erik Robert Jimmy Jansson (born September 17, 1985) is a Swedish singer and songwriter. At Melodifestivalen 2020 he set a new record for the amount of competing entries by a composer at one contest with six entries.

Music career
Jansson's music career began when he formed a rock band, The Poets, with some of his friends in 2001.  That same year, they were chosen to compete in Melodifestivalen with the song "What Difference Does It Make," but did not make it to the finals.

In 2003 Jansson was a reality show contestant, Fame Factory, on TV3 in Sweden, who released in 2004 his first single, "Godmorgon världen," that reached No. 1 on the Swedish charts although he did not win the show.  His follow-up single "Som sommaren" peaked at No. 4. and Jansson's third single, "Flickan från det blå" (both from his debut album Flickan från det blå) reached No. 40.

In 2005, he returned to Melodifestivalen, as a solo artist.  He reached the finals with the song "Vi kan gunga," ultimately placing sixth.  When the song was released as a single that same year, it received Jansson's highest chart placement, No. 1.  In the wake of the single's success, Jansson released his second album, Som en blixt, and, several months later, a second single from the album, "En underbar refräng".

On February 10, 2007 Jansson competed in Melodifestivalen for a third time, singing the song "Amanda". He shared a 3rd place in the semi-final and got a place in the second chance round.

On March 3, 2007 Jansson lost the first voting round to Sanna Nielsen in the Second round of eliminations; he was eliminated from going to the Eurovision Song Contest.

When "Amanda" was released as a single, it peaked at number three on the Swedish Singles Chart.  The album that followed it, Sån e jag, reached No. 9 on the charts and its second single, "Överallt," peaked at No. 2, spending two weeks in the charts as opposed to "Amanda"'s twelve weeks.

Personal life
Jansson was engaged with Sandra Dahlberg, who was also a contestant in Fame Factory 2002 and has also competed in Melodifestivalen. Dahlberg gave birth to their child, a boy named Vilmer, on February 12, 2007. Jansson and Dahlberg separated in 2010.

Discography
(with Swedish chart positions)

Albums
Flickan från det blå (2004) – No. 2
Som en blixt (2005) – No. 3
Sån e jag (2007) – No. 9

Singles
"Godmorgon världen" (2004) – No. 2
"Som sommaren" (2004) – No. 4
"Flickan från det blå" (2004) – No. 40
"Vi kan gunga" (2005) – No. 1
"En underbar refräng" (2005) – No. 4
"Amanda" (2007) – No. 3
"Överallt" (2007) – No. 3

Songwriting discography

Eurovision Song Contest national finals entries
Melodifestivalen entries (Sweden)

Beovizija entries (Serbia)

Dansk Melodi Grand Prix entries (Denmark)

EMA entries (Slovenia)

Melodi Grand Prix entries (Norway)

Benidorm Fest entries (Spain)

References

External links
Official site
Melodifestivalen 2007 Profile

1985 births
Living people
People from Gothenburg
Melodifestivalen contestants of 2007
Melodifestivalen contestants of 2006
Melodifestivalen contestants of 2005
Melodifestivalen contestants of 2002